Ben Seymour may refer to:
 Ben Seymour (rugby union)
 Ben Seymour (footballer)

See also
 Benjamin Seymour, Canadian politician